The 2016 Nobel Prize in Literature was awarded to the American singer-songwriter Bob Dylan (born 1941) "for having created new poetic expressions within the great American song tradition". The prize was announced by the Swedish Academy on 13 October 2016. He is the 12th Nobel laureate from the United States.

Laureate 

Bob Dylan's songs are rooted in the rich tradition of American folk music and are influenced by the poets of modernism and the beatnik movement. Early on, Dylan's lyrics incorporated social struggles and political protest. Love and religion are other important themes in his songs. His writing is often characterized by refined rhymes and it paints surprising, sometimes surreal imagery. Since his debut in 1962, he has repeatedly reinvented his songs and music. He has also written prose, including his memoirs Chronicles: Volume One (2004) and poetry collection Tarantula (1971).

Dylan's acceptance of award 
The Nobel Prize committee announced on October 13, 2016, that it would be awarding Dylan the Nobel Prize in Literature "for having created new poetic expressions within the great American song tradition". Dylan remained silent for days after receiving the award, before telling journalist Edna Gundersen that getting the award was "amazing, incredible. Whoever dreams about something like that?"

The Swedish Academy announced in November 2016 that Dylan would not travel to Stockholm for the Nobel Prize Ceremony due to "pre-existing commitments". At the Nobel Banquet in Stockholm on December 10, 2016, Dylan's speech was given by Azita Raji, U.S. Ambassador to Sweden. Patti Smith accepted Dylan's Nobel and performed his song "A Hard Rain's A-Gonna Fall" to orchestral accompaniment.

On April 2, 2017, Academy secretary Sara Danius reported: "Earlier today the Swedish Academy met with Bob Dylan for a private ceremony [with no media present] in Stockholm, during which Dylan received his gold medal and diploma. Twelve members of the Academy were present. Spirits were high. Champagne was had. Quite a bit of time was spent looking closely at the gold medal, in particular the beautifully crafted back, an image of a young man sitting under a laurel tree who listens to the Muse. Taken from Virgil's Aeneid, the inscription reads: Inventas vitam iuvat excoluisse per artes, loosely translated as 'And they who bettered life on earth by their newly found mastery'".

Dylan's Nobel Lecture was posted on the Nobel Prize website on June 5, 2017. The New York Times pointed out that, in order to collect the prize's eight million Swedish kronor (US$900,000), the Swedish Academy's rules stipulate the laureate "must deliver a lecture within six months of the official ceremony, which would have made Mr. Dylan's deadline June 10". Academy secretary Danius commented: "The speech is extraordinary and, as one might expect, eloquent. Now that the lecture has been delivered, the Dylan adventure is coming to a close". In his essay, Dylan writes about the impact that three important books made on him: Herman Melville's Moby-Dick, Erich Maria Remarque's All Quiet on the Western Front and Homer's Odyssey. He concludes: "Our songs are alive in the land of the living. But songs are unlike literature. They're meant to be sung, not read. The words in Shakespeare's plays were meant to be acted on the stage. Just as lyrics in songs are meant to be sung, not read on a page. And I hope some of you get the chance to listen to these lyrics the way they were intended to be heard: in concert or on record or however people are listening to songs these days. I return once again to Homer, who says, 'Sing in me, oh Muse, and through me tell the story'".

Literary influences and references in Dylan’s work 

References to poets and other writers have played a notable role in Dylan’s work from the artist’s early days in the 1960s and 70s.  Dylan’s lyrics over the decades have directly named, among others: William Blake, T.S. Eliot, Allen Ginsberg, Erica Jong, James Joyce, Jack Kerouac, Edgar Allan Poe, Ezra Pound, Arthur Rimbaud and William Shakespeare.

In 2017, the year after Dylan received his Nobel Prize, Harvard University Classics Professor Richard F. Thomas published a book entitled Why Bob Dylan Matters.  In this work, Thomas suggests that Dylan’s lyrics contain many literary allusions, including to the works of classic poets Homer, Ovid and Virgil.  To support this claim, Thomas offered multiple examples of Dylan’s 21st-century lyrics side-by-side with lines from these poets. Towards the beginning of his book, Thomas further argues for situating Dylan firmly alongside those whose work seems to have inspired him, noting: "For the past forty years, as a classics professor, I have been living in the worlds of the Greek and Roman poets, reading them, writing about them, and teaching them to students in their original languages and in English translation. I have for even longer been living in the world of Bob Dylan’s songs, and in my mind Dylan long ago joined the company of those ancient poets.".

Thomas (2017) ends by addressing Dylan’s Nobel Lecture, during which – the author points out – Dylan extensively discussed three particular works of literature and the impressions these works made on him: Homer's the Odyssey, Moby-Dick by Herman Melville and All Quiet on the Western Front by Erich Maria Remarque.

Reactions 
The 2016 choice of Bob Dylan was the first time a musician and songwriter won the Nobel for Literature. The New York Times reported: "Mr. Dylan, 75, is the first musician to win the award, and his selection on Thursday is perhaps the most radical choice in a history stretching back to 1901." 

The award caused some controversy, particularly among writers who argued that the literary merits of Dylan's work were not equal to those of more traditional authors. Lebanese novelist Rabih Alameddine tweeted that "Bob Dylan winning a Nobel in Literature is like Mrs Fields being awarded 3 Michelin stars." The French writer Pierre Assouline described the decision as "contemptuous of writers". In a live webchat hosted by The Guardian, Norwegian writer Karl Ove Knausgård said that "I'm very divided. I love that the Nobel committee opens up for other kinds of literature – lyrics and so on. I think that's brilliant. But knowing that Dylan is the same generation as Thomas Pynchon, Philip Roth, Cormac McCarthy, makes it very difficult for me to accept it." Scottish novelist Irvine Welsh said "I'm a Dylan fan, but this is an ill conceived nostalgia award wrenched from the rancid prostates of senile, gibbering hippies."

Dylan's songwriting peer and friend Leonard Cohen said that no prizes were necessary to recognize the greatness of the man who transformed pop music with records like Highway 61 Revisited. "To me," Cohen said, "[the Nobel] is like pinning a medal on Mount Everest for being the highest mountain." Writer and commentator Will Self wrote that the award "cheapened" Dylan whilst hoping the laureate would "follow Sartre in rejecting the award".

Many prominent literary figures, however, expressed their admiration for Dylan in the wake of the artist’s Nobel milestone. A 2016 article in The New York Times noted that among the writers praising Dylan and the decision to award him a Nobel Prize in Literature were authors Stephen King, Joyce Carol Oates, and Salman Rushdie and former U.S. poet laureate Billy Collins. Rushdie is quoted in that article as calling Dylan "the brilliant inheritor of the bardic tradition."

Gallery
 13 October 2016: Announcement of the 2016 Nobel laureate in Literature by Permanent Secretary Sara Danius.

References

External links
Prize Announcement nobelprize.org
Award Ceremony Speech nobelprize.org

Bob Dylan
2016
2016 awards